Laure Gély (born 5 February 1979) is a French former gymnast. She competed in four events at the 1996 Summer Olympics.

References

1979 births
Living people
French female artistic gymnasts
Olympic gymnasts of France
Gymnasts at the 1996 Summer Olympics
Sportspeople from Saint-Étienne